Wilson Simonal de Castro, was a Brazilian singer,  born in Rio de Janeiro on February 23, 1938. He died in São Paulo on June 25, 2000. He was a singer with great success in the 1960s and in the first half of the 1970s. He was married two times and had two sons: Wilson Simoninha and Max de Castro, both are artists today. He also had a daughter, named Patricia.

Although relatively unknown outside of South America, two of his biggest hits were successfully covered by Sérgio Mendes-- "País Tropical" and "Sá Marina" (the latter as "Pretty World" with English lyrics by Marilyn and Alan Bergman).

Discography

From Studio
 1963 - Wilson Simonal Tem "algo mais"
 1964 - A nova dimensão do samba
 1965 - Wilson Simonal
 1965 - S'imbora
 1966 - Vou deixar cair...
 1967 - Wilson Simonal ao vivo
 1967 - Show em Simonal
 1967 - Alegria, alegria !!!
 1968 - Alegria, alegria - volume 2,ou Quem não tem swing morre com a boca cheia de formiga
 1969 - Alegria, alegria - volume 3, ou Cada um tem o disco que merece
 1969 - Alegria, alegria - volume 4, ou Homenagem à graça, à beleza, ao charme e ao veneno da mulher brasileira
 1970 - Simona
 1970 - México 70
 1971 - Jóia, Jóia
 1972 - Se dependesse de mim
 1973 - Olhaí, balândro..é bufo no birrolho grinza!
 1974 - Dimensão 75
 1975 - Ninguém proíbe o amor
 1977 - A vida é só cantar
 1979 - Se todo mundo cantasse seria bem mais fácil viver
 1981 - Wilson Simonal
 1985 - Alegria tropical
 1991 - Os sambas da minha terra
 1995 - Brasil
 1998 - Bem Brasil - Estilo Simonal

Compact
 1961 - Teresinha / Biquinis e borboletas (Carlos Imperial / Fernando César)
 1962 - Eu te amo/ Beija,meu bem
 1962 - Compacto Isto é Drink: Tem que balançar/ Olhou pra mim
 1963 - Walk right in/ fale de samba que eu vou
 1963 - Está nascendo um samba/ Garota legal
 1965 - De manhã/ ...das rosas/ Cuidado cantor - Passarinho-Nega - Não ponha a mão
 1966 - Se você gostou
 1966 - Mamãe passou açúcar em mim/ Tá por fora
 1966 - Compact in Spanish : Mamãe passou açúcar em mim/ A praça
 1966 - A banda/ Disparada/ Quem sambafica/ Máscara negra
 1967 - Tributo a Martin Luther King/ Deixa quem quiser falar
 1967 - A praça/ Ela é demais
 1967 - Balada do Vietnã/ O milagre
 1968 - O samba do crioulo doido/ Alegria, alegria/ Pata, pata/ A rosa da roda
 1968 - Correnteza/ A saudade mata a gente/ Terezinha de Jesus
 1968 - A namorada de um amigo meu
 1969 - Se você pensa
 1970 - Na Tonga da mironga do Kabuletê/ No clarão da lua cheia
 1970 - Compacto em italiano: País tropical/ Ecco il tipo (che io cercavo)
 1970 - Kiki/ Menininhas do Leblon/ Aqui é o país do futebol/ Eu sonhei que tu estavas tão linda
 1970 - Brasil, eu fico/ Canção nº 21/Resposta/ Que cada um cumpra com o seu dever
 1970 - Compacto Promo Shell: Hino do V Festival Internacional da Canção/ Brasil, eu fico/ Que cada um cumpra com o seu dever
 1971 - Obrigado, Pelé
 1971 - Na Galha do Cajueiro/Ouriço/ África África

Posthumous and collections
 1994 - A Bossa e o Balanço
 1997 - Meus momentos: Wilson Simonal
 2002 - De A a Z : Wilson Simonal
 2003 - Alegria, alegria
 2003 - Se todo mundo cantasse seria bem mais fácil viver (relançamento)
 2004 - Rewind - Simonal Remix
 2004 - Wilson Simonal na Odeon (1961-1971)
 2004 - Série Retratos: Wilson Simonal
 2009 - Wilson Simonal - Um Sorriso Pra Você

Soundtrack
 2009 - Simonal - Ninguém Sabe o Duro Que Dei

References

External links
  Detailed biography at AllMusic

1938 births
2000 deaths
Musicians from Rio de Janeiro (city)
20th-century Brazilian male singers
20th-century Brazilian singers